In Battle There Is No Law! is the debut album by British death metal band Bolt Thrower. It was recorded at Loco studios by Andrew Fryer, and mixed at Clockwork by Alan Scott. It was released on Vinyl Solution as Sol 11 in 1988 and re-released on Vinyl Solution as Sol 11 in 1992, with a different album sleeve. The album was again re-released in 2005 with the old album sleeve restored. The sound of the album dominantly featured characteristics of grindcore, with lyrics socio-politically charged as the members had roots in hardcore punk, and created a sound that was heavily influenced by their roots.

German melodic death metal/metalcore act Heaven Shall Burn used the same album title for their debut EP as a homage to Bolt Thrower, claiming that the band had a huge influence on their music.

Track listing
All songs written by Bolt Thrower

Personnel
Bolt Thrower
 Karl Willetts - vocals
 Gavin Ward - guitars
 Barry Thomson - guitars
 Andrew Whale - drums
 Jo Bench - Bass guitar

Production
 Andrew Fryer - Production
 Alan Scott - Mix
 Paul McHale - Front cover
 Jim - Additional artwork

External links
[ In Battle There Is No Law!] at Allmusic 

1988 debut albums
Bolt Thrower albums